Hafiz Adams (born 12 July 1992) is a Ghanaian professional footballer who plays as a defender for Ghanaian Premier League side Real Tamale United. He previously played for and captained Wa All Stars to their first league title in 2016.

Career

Wa All Stars 
Adams started his career in his home town club Wa All Stars, now Legon Cities FC, graduating from the youth side to captain the club. He spent eight seasons with the club, from 2009 to 2017. During the 2016 season, he played 28 out of 30 league matches helping them to secure their first ever league title, making it the first time a team from Northern Ghana won a league title. He served as club captain during that season till he left in 2017. He went on and played 16 league matches in the 2017 season. In November 2017, after an impressive season, Adams was linked with a move to then League Champions Aduana Stars.

Aduana Stars 
On 6 December 2017, Adams joined Dormaa-based side Aduana Stars ahead of the GHALCA Top 8 competition as the club also sort to bolster their squad before the start of the 2018 CAF Champions league. He signed a three-year deal with the club after successful negotiations and passing his mandatory medicals. He was expected to serve as the replacement for Aduana's long serving right-back Godfred Saka, who had moved to Nigerian club Enyimba FC. During 2018 Ghanaian Premier League season, he played 11 matches and scored a goal. In the 2019 GFA Normalization Committee Special Competition, he played 11 matches.

During the 2019–20 Ghana Premier League season, he played 5 matches before the league was brought to a halt as a result of the COVID-19 pandemic. With the league set to restart he made the squad list for the 2020–21 Ghana Premier League season. In December 2020, Adams signed a short-term one-year extension contract with the club, which was to keep him at the club till the end of the 2020–21 season. On 18 January 2021, he was adjudged the man of the match after an impressive display in helping his team to a 2–1 victory after goals from Yahaya Mohammed and Fatawu Abdulrahaman over his former club Legon Cities.

Personal life 
Adams is a native of Wa. He is devout Muslim.

Honours 
Wa All Stars

 Ghana Premier League: 2016
 Ghana Super Cup: 2017
Aduana Stars

 Ghana Super Cup: 2018

References

External links 

Living people
1992 births
Legon Cities FC players
Association football defenders
Ghanaian footballers
Aduana Stars F.C. players
Ghana Premier League players
People from Upper West Region
Ghanaian Muslims